Conrad Leinemann (born April 2, 1971 in Kelowna, British Columbia) is a male beach volleyball player from Canada, who won the gold medal in the men's beach team competition at the 1999 Pan American Games in Winnipeg, Manitoba, partnering Jody Holden. He represented his native country at the 2000 Summer Olympics in Sydney, Australia.

References
 Profile at the Beach Volleyball Database

1971 births
Living people
Canadian men's beach volleyball players
Beach volleyball players at the 2000 Summer Olympics
Olympic beach volleyball players of Canada
Beach volleyball players at the 1999 Pan American Games
University of British Columbia alumni
Sportspeople from Kelowna
Canadian people of German descent
UBC Thunderbirds men's volleyball players
Canadian men's volleyball players
Pan American Games gold medalists for Canada
Pan American Games medalists in volleyball
Medalists at the 1999 Pan American Games